Shāh Kamāl Quḥāfah (1291–1385), was a philanthropist, pioneer, social and religious activist.

Life
Shah Kamal was born in Makkah, Shah Kamal Quhafah was a descendant of Abdur Rahman ibn Abi Bakr, who was the eldest son of Abu Bakr, the First Caliph of Islam. He was a Quréish; belonged to Banu Tahim, which was a distinguished clan of the tribes of Ishmael and the Quréish. Shah Kamal Quhafah came to Bangladesh with his newlywed wife to spread egalitarian pursuit of life and meet his father, Burhanuddin Ketan, who had already travelled to Chittagong leading an expedition of twelve Sufi dervish. Burhanuddin Ketan is known in Chittagong as Shah Kat’tal, Qat’tal Shah and Gazi Kadal Khan. He has two Mazar, one at Katalganj, Chittagong and another at Faringajuri or Faringi Bazaar. He travelled to Sylhet with his wife and twelve companions in 1315 to disseminate ideals of socio-religious harmony and meet his father, Khwaja Burhanuddin Ketan, who had travelled to Sylhet a decade earlier with Shah Jalal in 1303.

Shah Kamal and his companions sought an audience with Shah Jalal upon arriving at Sylhet. After becoming disciples of Shah Jalal, the group sojourned at Sylhet until June 1315.

The twelve companions of Kamal were Pir Kallu Shah (Pirergaon) Shah Chand (Chandbharang), Dawar Bakhsh Khatib (Dawarshahi or Dawarai), Syed Zia Uddin (Mukan Bazaar), Shamsuddin Bihari (Aatghar), Shah Faizullah (Feizi or Fesi), Shah Jalaluddin (Qusipur or Quskipur), Shah Tajuddin, Syed Bahauddin (Mukan Bazar), Shah Ruknuddin, Syed Shamsuddin (Syedpur) and Shah Manik (Manihara).

Kamal was a pioneer, known for his initiatives to establish the very first human settlement on islands of the erstwhile little sea by the name of Ratnang. Eventually, this settlement became a fully-fledged village, which now called, Shaharpara. Salient amongst his pioneering work were building of a hospice, boarding house, mosque and seminary at Shaharpara. These institutes provided unparalleled services to people. He developed fully protected ponds for the preservation of drinking water; most of these ponds are in decaying conditions and nowadays they are hardly used for drinking water.

Descendants
Descendants of Shah Kamal Quḥāfah are settled in Shaharpara, Patli Aurangabad and Dargah Mahallah in Sylhet and they have formed very distinguished families, which are known as Kamalis of Shaharpara, Qurayshis of Patli and Muftis of Sylhet. Kamali, Qurayshi, Mufti, Khwaja, Siddiqui and Shah are the surnames invariably used by the descendants of Shah Kamal Quḥāfah. Descendants of Shah Kamal Quḥāfah have mainly extended to a number of  families:  Mullah Family, Shahjee Family, Baglar Family in Shaharpara, Qureshi Family in Patli and Mufti Family in Sylhet Dargah Mahallah.  Maulana Shah Shamsuddin Qureshi, a descendant of Shah Kamal Quḥāfah, established the Qurayshi family in Patli and Maulana Shah Zia Uddin Qurayshi, another descendant of Shah Kamal Quḥāfah, established the Mufti Family at Dargah Mohallah, Sylhet.

Mullah Bari
Mullah Bari was established by Shah Jalaluddin Qureshi, eldest son of Shah Kamal, and hitherto it belongs to his progeny. Mullah Bari was a home of scholars, lawyers and jurists, who interpreted and standardised laws and customs.

Shahji Bari
Shahji Bhari was established by Shah Muazzamuddin Qurayshi, second son of Shah Kamal, and hitherto it belongs to his descendants. Shahji Bari was home of monarchs (shah) and statesmen.

Baglar Bari
Baglar Bari was established by Shah Jamaluddin Qurayshi, youngest son of Shah Kamal, and hitherto it belongs to his offspring. 'Baglar' means wealthy and 'Baglarbag' means Commander-in-chief. Baglar Bari is an abbreviation of 'Baglarbag' and Baglar Bari was home of treasury and commander-in-chief.

Qurayshi Bari
Qurayshi Bari was established by Maulana Shah Shamsuddin Qurayshi, descendant of Shah Jalaluddin Qurayshi, eldest son of Shah Kamal, and it is located on west of village Patli. Currently there are five Qurayshi Bari in Kunarpara and one at Aurangabad, both Kunarpara and Aurangabad were part of Aurangabad mauza, but in recent past, they have been merged with the village of greater Patli. Aurangabad belongs to offspring of Khwaja Fakhruddin Qurayshi, youngest son of Maulana Shamsuddin Qurayshiand Kunarpara belongs to offspring of Shah Siqah Uddin Qurayshi, eldest son of Maulana Shamsuddin Qurayshi.

Mufti Bari
Mufti Bari was established by Maulana Ziauddin Qurayshi, descendant of Shah Jalaluddin Qurayshi, eldest son of Shah Kamal, and it is located at Dargah Mahallah, Sylhet. Mufti Bari was home for jurists, who interpreted law before legal verdicts were pronounced. Maulana Zia Uddin Qurayshi, founded the very first school in Sylhet.

Heritage
Mausoleum of Shah Kamal Quhafah beside his wife and behind his beloved younger son Shah Jamaluddin Qurayshi are at dargah precinct in Kamalshahi, Shaharpara, Sunamganj, Bangladesh. Tomb of his first son, Shah Jalaluddin Qurayshi, is also in the same enclosure. There is a mosque and a site of medieval prayer alter where his disciples meditated for eternal salvation.

Bibliography

1291 births
1385 deaths
People from Mecca
Saudi Arabian Muslims
People from Jagannathpur Upazila
14th-century Indian Muslims
Bengali Sufi saints